The Folkestone Boat, Boulogne or Departure of the Folkestone Steamer (French - Le Départ du vapeur de Folkestone) is an 1869 painting by Édouard Manet, produced during one of his regular summer stays at Boulogne-sur-Mer. It shows a dawn scene with the steamship which regularly sailed between Boulogne and Folkestone – Manet and his family had embarked on it the previous year en route to London and the woman in white on the far left of the work is Suzanne Manet, accompanied by their son Léon. It is now in the Philadelphia Museum of Art.

The canvas is one of the most notable examples of how Manet knew how to play with light and color to give his works an atmosphere of joy and lightheartedness.

References

Paintings in the collection of the Philadelphia Museum of Art
1869 paintings
Paintings by Édouard Manet
Maritime paintings